Anjirlu (also Romanized as Anjīrlū) is a village in Anjirlu Rural District, in the Central District of Bileh Savar County, Ardabil Province, Iran. At the 2006 census, its population was 929, in 180 families.

References 

Towns and villages in Bileh Savar County